A drought is defined as drier than normal conditions. This means that a drought is "a moisture deficit relative to the average water availability at a given location and season". A drought can last for days, months or years. Drought often exerts substantial impacts on the ecosystems and agriculture of affected regions, and causes harm to the local economy. Annual dry seasons in the tropics significantly increase the chances of a drought developing and subsequent wildfires. Periods of heat can significantly worsen drought conditions by hastening evaporation of water vapour.

Drought is a recurring feature of the climate in most parts of the world, becoming more extreme and less predictable due to climate change, which dendrochronological studies date back to 1900. There are three kinds of drought effects, environmental, economic and social. Environmental effects include the drying of wetlands, more and larger wildfires, loss of biodiversity. Economic consequences include disruption of water supplies for municipal economies; lower agricultural, forest, game, and fishing outputs; higher food-production costs; and problems with water supply for the energy sector. Social and health costs include the negative effect on the health of people directly exposed to this phenomenon (excessive heat waves), high food costs, stress caused by failed harvests, water scarcity, etc. Prolonged droughts have caused mass migrations and humanitarian crisis.  

Many plant species, such as those in the family Cactaceae (or cacti), have drought tolerance adaptations like reduced leaf area and waxy cuticles to enhance their ability to tolerate drought. Some others survive dry periods as buried seeds. Semi-permanent drought produces arid biomes such as deserts and grasslands. Most arid ecosystems have inherently low productivity. 

The most prolonged drought ever in the world in recorded history continues in the Atacama Desert in Chile (400 years). Throughout history, humans have usually viewed droughts as "disasters" due to the impact on food availability and the rest of society. Humans have often tried to explain droughts as either a natural disaster, caused by humans, or the result of supernatural forces.

Definition 

The IPCC Sixth Assessment Report defines a drought simply as "drier than normal conditions". This means that a drought is "a moisture deficit relative to the average water availability at a given location and season".  

According to National Integrated Drought Information System, a multi-agency partnership, drought is generally defined as “a deficiency of precipitation over an extended period of time (usually a season or more), resulting in a water shortage”.  The National Weather Service office of the NOAA defines drought as "a deficiency of moisture that results in adverse impacts on people, animals, or vegetation over a sizeable area".

Drought is a complex phenomenon − relating to the absence of water − which is difficult to monitor and define. By the early 1980's, over 150 definitions of "drought" had already been published. The range of definitions reflects differences in regions, needs, and disciplinary approaches.

Categories 
There are three major categories of drought based on where in the water cycle the moisture deficit occurs: meteorological drought, hydrological drought, and agricultural or ecological drought. A meteorological drought occurs due to lack of precipitation. A hydrological drought is related to low runoff, streamflow, and reservoir storage. An agricultural or ecological drought is causing plant stress from a combination of evaporation and low soil moisture. Some organizations add another category: socioeconomic drought occurs when the demand for an economic good exceeds supply as a result of a weather-related shortfall in water supply. The socioeconomic drought is a similar concept to water scarcity. 

The different categories of droughts have different causes but similar effects:
 Meteorological drought occurs when there is a prolonged time with less than average precipitation. Meteorological drought usually precedes the other kinds of drought. As a drought persists, the conditions surrounding it gradually worsen and its impact on the local population gradually increases.
 Hydrological drought is brought about when the water reserves available in sources such as aquifers, lakes and reservoirs fall below a locally significant threshold. Hydrological drought tends to show up more slowly because it involves stored water that is used but not replenished. Like an agricultural drought, this can be triggered by more than just a loss of rainfall. For instance, around 2007 Kazakhstan was awarded a large amount of money by the World Bank to restore water that had been diverted to other nations from the Aral Sea under Soviet rule. Similar circumstances also place their largest lake, Balkhash, at risk of completely drying out.
 Agricultural or ecological droughts affect crop production or ecosystems in general. This condition can also arise independently from any change in precipitation levels when either increased irrigation or soil conditions and erosion triggered by poorly planned agricultural endeavors cause a shortfall in water available to the crops.

Causes

General precipitation deficiency 

Mechanisms of producing precipitation include convective, stratiform, and orographic rainfall.  Convective processes involve strong vertical motions that can cause the overturning of the atmosphere in that location within an hour and cause heavy precipitation, while stratiform processes involve weaker upward motions and less intense precipitation over a longer duration. Precipitation can be divided into three categories, based on whether it falls as liquid water, liquid water that freezes on contact with the surface, or ice. Droughts occur mainly in areas where normal levels of rainfall are, in themselves, low. If these factors do not support precipitation volumes sufficiently to reach the surface over a sufficient time, the result is a drought.  Drought can be triggered by a high level of reflected sunlight and above average prevalence of high pressure systems, winds carrying continental, rather than oceanic air masses, and ridges of high pressure areas aloft can prevent or restrict the developing of thunderstorm activity or rainfall over one certain region.  Once a region is within drought, feedback mechanisms such as local arid air, hot conditions which can promote warm core ridging, and minimal evapotranspiration can worsen drought conditions.

Dry season 

Within the tropics, distinct, wet and dry seasons emerge due to the movement of the Intertropical Convergence Zone or Monsoon trough. The dry season greatly increases drought occurrence, and is characterized by its low humidity, with watering holes and rivers drying up.  Because of the lack of these watering holes, many grazing animals are forced to migrate due to the lack of water in search of more fertile lands. Examples of such animals are zebras, elephants, and wildebeest. Because of the lack of water in the plants, bushfires are common.  Since water vapor becomes more energetic with increasing temperature, more water vapor is required to increase relative humidity values to 100% at higher temperatures (or to get the temperature to fall to the dew point).  Periods of warmth quicken the pace of fruit and vegetable production, increase evaporation and transpiration from plants, and worsen drought conditions.

El Niño–Southern Oscillation (ENSO) 

The El Niño–Southern Oscillation (ENSO) phenomenon can sometimes play a significant role in drought. ENSO comprises two patterns of temperature anomalies in the central Pacific Ocean, known as La Niña and El Niño. La Niña events are generally associated with drier and hotter conditions and further exacerbation of drought in California and the Southwestern United States, and to some extent the U.S. Southeast. Meteorological  scientists have observed that La Niñas have become more frequent over time. 

Conversely, during El Niño events, drier and hotter weather occurs in parts of the Amazon River Basin, Colombia, and Central America.  Winters during the El Niño are warmer and drier than average conditions in the Northwest, northern Midwest, and northern Mideast United States, so those regions experience reduced snowfalls.  Conditions are also drier than normal from December to February in south-central Africa, mainly in Zambia, Zimbabwe, Mozambique, and Botswana.  Direct effects of El Niño resulting in drier conditions occur in parts of Southeast Asia and Northern Australia, increasing bush fires, worsening haze, and decreasing air quality dramatically. Drier-than-normal conditions are also in general observed in Queensland, inland Victoria, inland New South Wales, and eastern Tasmania from June to August.  As warm water spreads from the west Pacific and the Indian Ocean to the east Pacific, it causes extensive drought in the western Pacific. Singapore experienced the driest February in 2014 since records began in 1869, with only 6.3 mm of rain falling in the month and temperatures hitting as high as 35 °C on 26 February. The years 1968 and 2005 had the next driest Februaries, when 8.4 mm of rain fell.

Precipitation deficiency due to climate change 

Global climate change is expected to trigger droughts with a substantial impact on agriculture throughout the world, and especially in developing nations. Along with drought in some areas, flooding and erosion could increase in others. Some proposed climate change mitigation actions that focus on more active techniques, solar radiation management through the use of a space sunshade for one, may also carry with them increased chances of drought.

There is a rise of compound warm-season droughts in Europe that are concurrent with an increase in potential evapotranspiration.

Erosion and human activities 

Human activity can directly trigger exacerbating factors such as over farming, excessive irrigation, deforestation, and erosion adversely impact the ability of the land to capture and hold water.  In arid climates, the main source of erosion is wind.  Erosion can be the result of material movement by the wind.  The wind can cause small particles to be lifted and therefore moved to another region (deflation).  Suspended particles within the wind may impact on solid objects causing erosion by abrasion (ecological succession). Wind erosion generally occurs in areas with little or no vegetation, often in areas where there is insufficient rainfall to support vegetation.

Loess is a homogeneous, typically nonstratified, porous, friable, slightly coherent, often calcareous, fine-grained, silty, pale yellow or buff, windblown (Aeolian) sediment. It generally occurs as a widespread blanket deposit that covers areas of hundreds of square kilometers and tens of meters thick. Loess often stands in either steep or vertical faces. Loess tends to develop into highly rich soils. Under appropriate climatic conditions, areas with loess are among the most agriculturally productive in the world. Loess deposits are geologically unstable by nature, and will erode very readily. Therefore, windbreaks (such as big trees and bushes) are often planted by farmers to reduce the wind erosion of loess.  Wind erosion is much more severe in arid areas and during times of drought. For example, in the Great Plains, it is estimated that soil loss due to wind erosion can be as much as 6100 times greater in drought years than in wet years.

Consequences 

One can divide the effects of droughts and water shortages into three groups: environmental, economic and social (including health).
 In the case of environmental effects: lower surface and subterranean water-levels, lower flow-levels (with a decrease below the minimum leading to direct danger for amphibian life), increased pollution of surface water, the drying out of wetlands, more and larger wildfires, higher deflation intensity, loss of biodiversity, worse health of trees and the appearance of pests and dendroid diseases.
 Economic losses include lower agricultural, forests, game and fishing output, higher food-production costs, lower energy-production levels in hydro plants, losses caused by depleted water tourism and transport revenue, problems with water supply for the energy sector and for technological processes in metallurgy, mining, the chemical, paper, wood, foodstuff industries etc., disruption of water supplies for municipal economies. 
 Social and health costs include the negative effect on the health of people directly exposed to this phenomenon (excessive heat waves), possible limitation of water supplies, increased pollution levels, high food-costs, stress caused by failed harvests, water scarcity, etc. This explains why droughts and water scarcity operate as a factor which increases the gap between developed and developing countries.

Effects vary according to vulnerability. For example, subsistence farmers are more likely to migrate during drought because they do not have alternative food-sources. Areas with populations that depend on water sources as a major food-source are more vulnerable to famine.

Environmental and economic consequences 
Common environmental and economic consequences of drought include:
 Diminished crop growth or yield productions and carrying capacity for livestock
 Alter the functional diversity of plant communities which can impact net primary production and other ecosystem services.
 Wildfires, such as Australian bushfires and wildfires in the United States, become more common during times of drought and may cause human deaths.
 Dust bowls, themselves a sign of erosion, which further erode the landscape
 Dust storms, when drought hits an area suffering from desertification and erosion
 Habitat damage, affecting both terrestrial and aquatic wildlife
 Alteration of diversity of plant communities, which can have an impact on net primary production and other ecosystem services.
 Reduced electricity production due to reduced water-flow through hydroelectric dams
 Shortages of water for industrial users
 Snake migration, which results in snake-bites
 Exposure and oxidation of acid sulfate soils due to falling surface- and ground-water levels.
 Reduced water quality, because lower water-flows reduce dilution of pollutants and increase contamination of remaining water-sources. 
 Land degradation and loss of soil moisture, resulting in the destruction of cropland productivity.

Social and health consequences 

Water scarcity, crop failure, famine and hunger – drought provides too little water to support food crops; malnutrition, dehydration and related diseases
Mass migration, resulting in internal displacement and international refugees
Social unrest
 War over natural resources, including water and food
 Cyanotoxin accumulation within food chains and water supply (some of which are among the most potent toxins known to science) can cause cancer with low exposure over the long term. High levels of microcystin appeared in San Francisco Bay Area salt-water shellfish and fresh-water supplies throughout the state of California in 2016.

Impacts on crops 

Water stress affects plant development and quality in a variety of ways: firstly drought can cause poor germination and impaired seedling development. At the same time plant growth relies on cellular division, cell enlargement, and differentiation. Drought stress impairs mitosis and cell elongation via loss of turgor pressure which results in poor growth. Development of leaves is also dependent upon turgor pressure, concentration of nutrients, and carbon assimilates all of which are reduced by drought conditions, thus drought stress lead to a decrease in leaf size and number. Plant height, biomass, leaf size and stem girth has been shown to decrease in maize under water limiting conditions. Crop yield is also negatively effected by drought stress, the reduction in crop yield results from a decrease in photosynthetic rate, changes in leaf development, and altered allocation of resources all due to drought stress. Crop plants exposed to drought stress suffer from reductions in leaf water potential and transpiration rate. Water-use efficiency increases in crops such as wheat while decreasing in others, such as potatoes. 

Plants need water for the uptake of nutrients from the soil, and for the transport of nutrients throughout the plant: drought conditions limit these functions leading to stunted growth. Drought stress also causes a decrease in photosynthetic activity in plants due to the reduction of photosynthetic tissues, stomatal closure, and reduced performance of photosynthetic machinery. This reduction in photosynthetic activity contributes to the reduction in plant growth and yields. Another factor influencing reduced plant growth and yields include the allocation of resources; following drought stress plants will allocate more resources to roots to aid in water uptake increasing root growth and reducing the growth of other plant parts while decreasing yields.

Protection, mitigation and relief 

Agriculturally, people can effectively mitigate much of the impact of drought through irrigation and crop rotation. Failure to develop adequate drought mitigation strategies carries a grave human cost in the modern era, exacerbated by ever-increasing population densities.  President Roosevelt on April 27, 1935, signed documents creating the Soil Conservation Service (SCS)—now the Natural Resources Conservation Service (NRCS).  Models of the law were sent to each state where they were enacted.  These were the first enduring practical programs to curtail future susceptibility to drought, creating agencies that first began to stress soil conservation measures to protect farm lands today.  It was not until the 1950s that there was an importance placed on water conservation was put into the existing laws (NRCS 2014).

Strategies for drought protection, mitigation or relief include:
 Dams – many dams and their associated reservoirs supply additional water in times of drought.
 Cloud seeding – a form of intentional weather modification to induce rainfall.  This remains a hotly debated topic, as the United States National Research Council released a report in 2004 stating that to date, there is still no convincing scientific proof of the efficacy of intentional weather modification.
 Desalination – use of sea water for irrigation or consumption.
 Drought monitoring – Continuous observation of rainfall levels and comparisons with current usage levels can help prevent man-made drought. For instance, analysis of water usage in Yemen has revealed that their water table (underground water level) is put at grave risk by over-use to fertilize their Khat crop. Careful monitoring of moisture levels can also help predict increased risk for wildfires, using such metrics as the Keetch-Byram Drought Index or Palmer Drought Index.
 Land use – Carefully planned crop rotation can help to minimize erosion and allow farmers to plant less water-dependent crops in drier years.
 Outdoor water-use restriction – Regulating the use of sprinklers, hoses or buckets on outdoor plants, filling pools, and other water-intensive home maintenance tasks.  Xeriscaping yards can significantly reduce unnecessary water use by residents of towns and cities.
 Rainwater harvesting – Collection and storage of rainwater from roofs or other suitable catchments.
 Recycled water – Former wastewater (sewage) that has been treated and purified for reuse.
 Transvasement – Building canals or redirecting rivers as massive attempts at irrigation in drought-prone areas.

Scale and examples 
Some large scale droughts in the 21st century included:
 The 1997–2009 Millennium Drought in Australia led to a water supply crisis across much of the country.  As a result, many desalination plants were built for the first time (see list).
 In 2006, Sichuan Province China experienced its worst drought in modern times with nearly 8 million people and over 7 million cattle facing water shortages.
 12-year drought that was devastating southwest Western Australia, southeast South Australia, Victoria and northern Tasmania was "very severe and without historical precedent".
 2015–2018 Cape Town water crisis. This likelihood was tripled by climate change. 

The Darfur conflict in Sudan, also affecting Chad, was fueled by decades of drought; combination of drought, desertification and overpopulation are among the causes of the Darfur conflict, because the Arab Baggara nomads searching for water have to take their livestock further south, to land mainly occupied by non-Arab farming people.

Approximately 2.4 billion people live in the drainage basin of the Himalayan rivers. India, China, Pakistan, Bangladesh, Nepal and Myanmar could experience floods followed by droughts in coming decades. Drought in India affecting the Ganges is of particular concern, as it provides drinking water and agricultural irrigation for more than 500 million people. The west coast of North America, which gets much of its water from glaciers in mountain ranges such as the Rocky Mountains and Sierra Nevada, also would be affected.

In 2005, parts of the Amazon basin experienced the worst drought in 100 years. A 23 July 2006 article reported Woods Hole Research Center results showing that the forest in its present form could survive only three years of drought. Scientists at the Brazilian National Institute of Amazonian Research argue in the article that this drought response, coupled with the effects of deforestation on regional climate, are pushing the rainforest towards a "tipping point" where it would irreversibly start to die. It concludes that the rainforest is on the brink of being turned into savanna or desert, with catastrophic consequences for the world's climate. According to the WWF, the combination of climate change and deforestation increases the drying effect of dead trees that fuels forest fires.

By far the largest part of Australia is desert or semi-arid lands commonly known as the outback. A 2005 study by Australian and American researchers investigated the desertification of the interior, and suggested that one explanation was related to human settlers who arrived about 50,000 years ago. Regular burning by these settlers could have prevented monsoons from reaching interior Australia. In June 2008 it became known that an expert panel had warned of long term, maybe irreversible, severe ecological damage for the whole Murray-Darling basin if it did not receive sufficient water by October 2008. Australia could experience more severe droughts and they could become more frequent in the future, a government-commissioned report said on July 6, 2008. Australian environmentalist Tim Flannery, predicted that unless it made drastic changes, Perth in Western Australia could become the world's first ghost metropolis, an abandoned city with no more water to sustain its population.  The long Australian Millennial drought broke in 2010.

Recurring droughts leading to desertification in East Africa have created grave ecological catastrophes, prompting food shortages in 1984–85, 2006 and 2011. During the 2011 drought, an estimated 50,000 to 150,000 people were reported to have died, though these figures and the extent of the crisis are disputed. In February 2012, the UN announced that the crisis was over due to a scaling up of relief efforts and a bumper harvest. Aid agencies subsequently shifted their emphasis to recovery efforts, including digging irrigation canals and distributing plant seeds. The 2020-2022 Horn of Africa drought has surpassed the horrific drought in 2010-2011 in both duration and severity.

In 2012, a severe drought struck the western Sahel. The Methodist Relief & Development Fund (MRDF) reported that more than 10 million people in the region were at risk of famine due to a month-long heat wave that was hovering over Niger, Mali, Mauritania and Burkina Faso. A fund of about £20,000 was distributed to the drought-hit countries.

History 

Throughout history, humans have usually viewed droughts as "disasters" due to the impact on food availability and the rest of society. Humans have often tried to explain droughts as either a natural disaster, caused by humans, or the result of supernatural forces.  It is among the earliest documented climatic events, present in the Epic of Gilgamesh and tied to the Biblical story of Joseph's arrival in and the later Exodus from ancient Egypt. Hunter-gatherer migrations in 9,500 BC Chile have been linked to the phenomenon, as has the exodus of early humans out of Africa and into the rest of the world around 135,000 years ago. Rituals exist to prevent or avert drought, rainmaking could go from dances to scapegoating to human sacrifices. Nowadays, those ancient practices are for the most part relegated to folklore and replaced by more rational water management.

Historical droughts include:
1540 Central Europe, said to be the “worst drought of the millennium” with eleven months without rain and temperatures of 5–7 °C above the average of the 20th century
 1900 India killing between 250,000 and 3.25 million.
 1921–22 Soviet Union in which over 5 million perished from starvation due to drought.
 1928–30 Northwest China resulting in over 3 million deaths by famine.
 1936 and 1941 Sichuan Province China resulting in 5 million and 2.5 million deaths respectively.

See also

References

Works cited

External links 

 GIDMaPS Global Integrated Drought Monitoring and Prediction System, University of California, Irvine
 Water scarcity from FAO Water (Food and Agriculture Organization of the United Nations)
 Global Real-Time Drought Media Monitoring

 
Meteorological phenomena
Civil defense
Climate variability and change
Hydrology
Water and the environment
Weather hazards
Articles containing video clips
Natural disasters